Jonathan Curran (born February 17, 1987) is an American professional golfer.

Curran was born in Hopkinton, Massachusetts. He played college golf at Vanderbilt University.

Curran turned professional in 2009. He played on the NGA Pro Golf Tour in 2013, winning one event and topping the money list.

Curran began playing on the Web.com Tour in 2014 and won his third event of the year, the Brasil Champions. He finished 12th on the 2014 Web.com Tour regular-season money list, earning a PGA Tour card for the 2014–15 season. Curran's best PGA Tour finishes are playoff losses at the 2015 Puerto Rico Open and 2016 Memorial Tournament.

Professional wins (3)

Web.com Tour wins (1)

NGA Pro Golf Tour wins (1)
2013 Brunswick-Heritage Oaks Classic

Other wins (2)

Other playoff record (1–0)

Playoff record
PGA Tour playoff record (0–2)

Results in major championships

CUT = missed the half-way cut
"T" = tied

See also
2014 Web.com Tour Finals graduates

References

External links

American male golfers
Vanderbilt Commodores men's golfers
PGA Tour golfers
Korn Ferry Tour graduates
Golfers from Massachusetts
People from Hopkinton, Massachusetts
People from Jupiter, Florida
Sportspeople from Middlesex County, Massachusetts
Sportspeople from the Miami metropolitan area
1987 births
Living people